The Khantayka is a river in Krasnoyarsk Krai, Russia. It is a right tributary of the Yenisey. The source of the Khantayka is Lake Maloye Khantayskoye in the Putorana Massif. It flows through the Ust-Khantayka Reservoir.

See also
List of rivers of Russia

References

External links

Fishing in Russia

Rivers of Krasnoyarsk Krai